Ransom L. Ford (February 12, 18781973) was a Michigan politician.

Early life
Ford was born on February 12, 1878, in Byron, Michigan. Ford was of English parentage. Ford received an education from Chesaning High School.

Career
Ford was the owner and editor of the newspaper the Montrose Record from around 1900 until December 1, 1914. In 1912, Ford ran for the Michigan House of Representatives seat representing the Genesee County 1st district but was defeated by Progressive Party candidate Bert F. Crapser. In the November 3, 1914, election, Ford defeated Crapser in his attempt at re-election. Ford represented this district in the state house from January 1, 1915, until January 1, 1919.

Personal life
Ford was a member of the Montrose Lodge, and held the position of master and patron of different locations. Ford was Freemason and a member of the Order of the Eastern Star.

Death
Ford died in 1973.

References

1878 births
1973 deaths
American Freemasons
American people of English descent
People from Shiawassee County, Michigan
People from Genesee County, Michigan
Republican Party members of the Michigan House of Representatives
Order of the Eastern Star
20th-century American politicians
20th-century American newspaper publishers (people)
19th-century American newspaper editors